The list of shipwrecks in 1927 includes all ships sunk, foundered, grounded, or otherwise lost during 1927.

January

1 January

2 January

5 January

6 January

7 January

9 January

11 January

12 January

13 January

14 January

15 January

16 January

17 January

18 January

19 January

20 January

21 January

23 January

24 January

25 January

26 January

27 January

28 January

29 January

30 January

31 January

February

1 February

2 February

3 February

4 February

5 February

6 February

7 February

8 February

9 February

11 February

12 February

13 February

14 February

18 February

20 February

22 February

23 February

24 February

25 February

26 February

28 February

Unknown date

March

1 March

2 March

3 March

4 March

5 March

7 March

8 March

9 March

10 March

11 March

13 March

15 March

16 March

18 March

19 March

20 March

23 March

24 March

26 March

28 March

29 March

30 March

April

1 April

5 April

6 April

8 April

12 April

13 April

14 April

15 April

17 April

18 April

21 April

26 April

27 April

30 April

May

1 May

2 May

3 May

8 May

10 May

12 May

18 May

19 May

22 May

23 May

25 May

28 May

30 May

31 May

June

4 June

9 June

10 June

11 June

12 June

13 June

14 June

15 June

20 June

23 June

27 June

29 June

July

1 July

2 July

3 July

4 July

5 July

7 July

8 July

9 July

13 July

14 July

15 July

16 July

19 July

20 July

21 July

23 July

26 July

27 July

28 July

30 July

August

3 August

5 August

6 August

7 August

8 August

12 August

13 August

14 August

15 August

17 August

18 August

19 August

20 August

21 August

22 August

24 August

25 August

26 August

27 August

28 August

29 August

30 August

31 August

September

3 September

6 September

7 September

9 September

10 September

12 September

13 September

14 September

16 September

17 September

18 September

19 September

20 September

21 September

22 September

24 September

25 September

27 September

29 September

30 September

Unknown date

October

1 October

2 October

3 October

4 October

5 October

6 October

8 October

10 October

11 October

12 October

13 October

14 October

15 October

16 October

17 October

19 October

22 October

23 October

24 October

25 October

26 October

27 October

28 October

29 October

30 October

November

2 November

3 November

4 November

5 November

6 November

7 November

8 November

9 November

10 November

12 November

15 November

16 November

17 November

18 November

19 November

20 November

21 November

22 November

23 November

25 November

26 November

27 November

28 November

29 November

30 November

December

1 December

3 December

4 December

5 December

6 December

7 December

8 December

9 December

10 December

12 December

13 December

14 December

15 December

16 December

17 December

19 December

20 December

21 December

22 December

23 December

24 December

25 December

26 December

27 December

28 December

29 December

30 December

31 December

Unknown date

References 

1927
Shipwrecks